Jean-Marc Bory (17 March 1934 – 31 March 2001) was a Swiss actor. He appeared in 60 films and television shows between 1955 and 1996.

Partial filmography

 Black Dossier (1955) - Juge Jacques Arnaud
 The Lovers (1958) - Bernard Dubois-Lambert
 Wolves of the Deep (1959) - Tenente
 Les loups dans la bergerie (1960) - Roger
 Austerlitz (1960) - Soult
 Il carro armato dell'8 settembre (1960) - Carlo Bollini
 Adorable Liar (1962) - Martin
 Where the Truth Lies (1962) - François Rauchelle
 Love on a Pillow (1962) - Pierre Leroy
 Ro.Go.Pa.G. (1963) - Husband (segment "Il nuovo mondo")
 Sweet and Sour (1963) - L'homme au micro
 A Sentimental Attempt (1963) - Dino
 Portuguese Vacation (1963) - Jean-Marc
 Triple Cross (1966) - Resistance Leader (uncredited)
 The Stranger (1967) - (uncredited)
 I visionari (1968)
 Una prostituta al servizio del pubblico e in regola con le leggi dello stato (1971) - François Coly
 Comptes à rebours (1971) - Ferrier
 Le Voyage (1972) - Pierre
 Au rendez-vous de la mort joyeuse (1973) - Marc
 Madame Baptiste (1974, TV Movie) - Le père
 Creezy (1974) - Savarin
 Jamais plus toujours (1976) - Mathieu
 Le Juge Fayard dit Le Shériff (1977) - Lucien Degueldre dit Monsieur Paul
 The Blue Ferns (1977) - Stanislas
 L'amour des femmes (1981) - Bruno
 Chaste and Pure (1981) - Dr. Natal
 L'amour braque (1985) - Simon Venin
 Derborence (1985) - Nendaz
 Le meilleur de la vie (1985) - Le père de Véronique
 Bernadette (1988) - Le curé Peyramale / Father Peyramale
 Marie de Nazareth (1995) - Pilate

References

External links

1934 births
2001 deaths
Swiss male film actors